Jennette Michelle Faye McCurdy (born June 26, 1992) is an American writer, director, podcaster, singer and former actress. McCurdy's breakthrough role as Sam Puckett in the Nickelodeon sitcom iCarly (2007–2012) earned her various awards, including four Nickelodeon Kids' Choice Awards. She reprised the character in the iCarly spin-off series Sam & Cat (2013–2014) before leaving Nickelodeon. McCurdy also appeared in the television series Malcolm in the Middle (2003–2005), Zoey 101 (2005), Lincoln Heights (2007), True Jackson, VP (2009–2010), and Victorious (2012). She produced, wrote, and starred in her own webseries, What's Next for Sarah? (2014), and led the science-fiction series Between (2015–2016).

McCurdy independently released her debut single, "So Close", in 2009. She released her debut EP, Not That Far Away, in 2010, followed in 2012 by the Jennette McCurdy EP and the Jennette McCurdy album. The lead single, "Generation Love", reached number 44 on the Billboard Hot Country Songs.

In 2017, McCurdy quit acting and decided to pursue a career in writing and directing. In early 2020 she performed a one-woman show, I'm Glad My Mom Died, in Los Angeles and New York City; further dates were postponed to September 2021 due to the COVID-19 pandemic. In 2020, she began hosting an interview podcast, Empty Inside. In 2022, she released a well-reviewed and best-selling memoir, I'm Glad My Mom Died, describing her career as a child star and the abusive behavior of her deceased mother.

Early life
McCurdy was raised in Garden Grove, California, in a relatively poor Mormon family, though she ultimately left the religion in her early adulthood. Her mother, Debra McCurdy, home-schooled her and her three older brothers. The man she grew up believing was her father, Debra's husband Mark McCurdy, worked two jobs to support the family. After Debra's death, McCurdy learned that she was not his biological child.

Television, film, and music career

2000–2006: Career beginnings
In 2000, at the age of eight, McCurdy started her acting career on Mad TV. She then appeared in several television series, including CSI: Crime Scene Investigation, Malcolm in the Middle, Lincoln Heights, Will & Grace, Zoey 101, True Jackson, VP, Law and Order SVU, Medium, Judging Amy, The Inside, Karen Sisco, Over There, and Close to Home. In 2003, she acted in the film Hollywood Homicide. In 2005, she was nominated for a Young Artist Award for "Best Performance in a Television Series – Guest Starring Young Actress" for her performance in Strong Medicine. She also appeared in a commercial for Sprint.

2007–2012: iCarly and music

From 2007 to 2012, she starred as Sam Puckett in the Nickelodeon TV series iCarly. In 2008, she was nominated for a Young Artist Award for her work on iCarly and her performance as Dory Sorenson in the TV movie The Last Day of Summer. She was nominated for a 2009 Teen Choice Award in the Favorite TV Sidekick category for her work on iCarly. She played Bertha in Fred: The Movie, a movie based on a YouTube series about Fred Figglehorn.

In June 2008, McCurdy announced that she was working on her debut album. The first single, "So Close", was released on March 10, 2009. On May 19, her cover of the Amanda Stott song "Homeless Heart" was released. It was released in honor of McCurdy's recently deceased friend Cody Waters, who died at the age of nine from brain cancer, and 20% of the proceeds were donated to the Cody Waters Foundation. She met Waters through St. Jude Children's Research Hospital. In mid-2009, McCurdy was offered a record deal from both Big Machine Records and Capitol Records Nashville. McCurdy signed to Capitol Nashville. On April 16, 2010, samples of selected songs from McCurdy's upcoming debut country album were released online. The song clips were released for fans to vote for which one they believed should be McCurdy's first radio single. "Not That Far Away" received the most votes, and was released to country radio on May 24, 2010, and iTunes on June 1.

McCurdy's debut EP, Not That Far Away, was released on August 17, 2010. Her second single, "Generation Love", was released as a digital download on March 22, 2011, followed by its release to radio on April 25, 2011. McCurdy released a second EP, Jennette McCurdy, on February 8, 2012 at the clothing retailer Justice. Jennette McCurdy, her debut album, was released on June 5. Shortly after the release, McCurdy confirmed that she had left Capitol Nashville citing conflicts of a new series in which she was cast. In 2022, McCurdy described her music career as "a much-regretted country music blip".

2013–2015: Sam and Cat and Between
McCurdy starred alongside Ariana Grande in the Nickelodeon series Sam & Cat, reprising her role as Sam Puckett, with Grande reprising her role as Cat Valentine. The series' plot centers on the girls becoming roommates and starting their own babysitting business. It premiered on June 8, 2013. In 2014, McCurdy was absent from the Nickelodeon Kids' Choice Awards. Explaining her absence, McCurdy stated that Nickelodeon put her in an "uncomfortable, compromising, unfair situation" where she had to look out for herself, and McCurdy and Grande were having disagreements with the network over their respective salaries, and that McCurdy accused Nickelodeon of paying Grande more money. The network placed Sam & Cat into hiatus. The network initially stated that the hiatus was planned and that the series was not cancelled. On July 13, 2014, Nickelodeon announced that after only one season, Sam & Cat was cancelled. In an interview on Entertainment Pop, McCurdy mentioned that she later made up with Grande. In McCurdy's 2022 memoir I'm Glad My Mom Died she describes incidents at the network, such as when she was photographed in a bikini at a wardrobe fitting, and being encouraged to drink alcohol while underage by a person she identified as "the Creator". She stated that after the cancelation of Sam & Cat, Nickelodeon later offered her $300,000 to agree not to discuss her experiences at the network, an offer she turned down.

On August 13, 2014, McCurdy launched the online show What's Next for Sarah? She served as the star of the series as well as the writer of the show, along with duties as executive producer and editor. She says that the show is based loosely on her life and that the character she plays, Sarah Bronson, is based on her. In 2015, she began starring in the Netflix drama series Between. It was also announced that she would star in the teen comedy Little Bitches alongside Virginia Gardner and Kiersey Clemons.

2016–2018: Later work and retirement from acting
In August 2016, McCurdy signed a deal with digital production company Canvas Media Studios to develop projects and further utilize her social media connections with fans. She also starred as Claire in the psychological thriller film Pet.

Between was not renewed for a third season, and while critics acknowledged McCurdy as "one of the few cast members who can act", she expressed on her website that she felt ashamed of 90% of her résumé. She eventually decided to quit acting and to pursue writing and directing in 2017:

Once a very active user of Twitter, Facebook, Snapchat, and Instagram, she deleted all her past social media posts and set all her past videos and vlogs to "private" on YouTube and Vimeo.

In 2018, McCurdy wrote and directed her first short film, Kenny, a dramedy inspired by the death of her mother; the film also featured an all-female crew. Kenny was featured in The Hollywood Reporter and on Short of the Week. She has since released three more short films, which she also wrote and directed: The Grave; The McCurdys, a semi-autobiographical short based on her childhood; and Strong Independent Women, a short that deals with eating disorders. In late 2018, she announced that she hoped to direct more films.

Writing and live performance

In 2011, McCurdy began writing a series of articles for The Wall Street Journal. She has written eight pieces for the paper, on topics ranging from Shirley Temple to body shaming and a corporate culture that she perceives as smoke and mirrors. She has also written for Seventeen magazine and The Huffington Post.

McCurdy composed an article titled "Off-Camera, My Mom's Fight With Cancer", which was published in The Wall Street Journal in June 2011. It describes in detail her mother Debra's ongoing battle with cancer and how her family coped with the situation. The article also features advice from McCurdy on living with an ill parent. On September 20, 2013, her mother died, after being first diagnosed with cancer 17 years earlier.

In 2020, McCurdy created and starred in a one-woman tragicomedy show, I'm Glad My Mom Died, in various theaters in Los Angeles and New York. She later had to set her show into hiatus after the onset of the COVID-19 pandemic in the United States. For the first time since she opened up publicly about her eating disorder in 2019, she posted a new video on YouTube where she sings about her personal implications of finding herself in quarantine due to the outbreak. In July 2020, McCurdy posted a video on her YouTube channel and social media where she sings about starting a podcast called Empty Inside. She revealed on the podcast, during an interview with actress Anna Faris, that she had retired from professional acting. McCurdy stated she had been pushed into acting as a child by her mother, and soon became her family's primary source of income. She became "ashamed" of the roles she had played in the past, and after seeking therapy in the late 2010s, McCurdy decided to quit acting. When iCarly was revived that same year for Paramount+, McCurdy declined to reprise her role of Sam Puckett. In September 2021, McCurdy resumed performing her tragicomedy show in Los Angeles.

On August 9, 2022, McCurdy released a memoir, I'm Glad My Mom Died, under Simon & Schuster. The book was ranked number one on The New York Times Best Seller list for eight weeks following its release.

Following the success of I'm Glad My Mom Died, McCurdy signed a two-book deal with Penguin Random House's Ballantine Books label.

Personal life

Relationship with her mother
She has described the close relationship she had with her mother as abusive and "the heartbeat of my life". When McCurdy was two to three years old, her mother was diagnosed with breast cancer and underwent several surgeries, chemotherapy, and a bone marrow transplant. In 2010, her mother's cancer returned, and in 2013, she died; McCurdy was 21 years old.

McCurdy has revealed that she was emotionally and sexually abused by her mother. In an interview with People magazine, she said, "My mom's emotions were so erratic that it was like walking a tightrope every day." According to McCurdy, her mother pushed her into acting when she was six years old to both financially support her family, and because her mother had wanted to become a performer herself. She stated that her mother was "obsessed with making [her] a star" and detailed how her mother contributed to her eating disorder by introducing her to calorie restriction at age 11. She also revealed that until she was 16 or 17 years old, her mother performed vaginal and breast exams on her, ostensibly as a cancer screening, and never let her shower alone. McCurdy said that she refused to appear in the revival of iCarly because of the reminder of her mother's abuse during the original show, and that she appeared in the spin-off series Sam & Cat to please her mother. McCurdy stated in an interview that she did not receive all of her payment from acting as a minor, because her Coogan account was not properly filed.

In her 2022 memoir I'm Glad My Mom Died, the cover of which features McCurdy looking up and holding a pink urn with confetti spilling out,  McCurdy further described her mother's abusive and controlling influence.

Romantic relationships 
McCurdy dated American basketball player Andre Drummond in 2013.

Mental health
In March 2019, McCurdy publicly revealed in a Huffington Post article that, from age 11, she suffered from anorexia, and later bulimia. In the article, McCurdy describes her mother's and the entertainment industry's aiding of eating disorders, seeking help after her sister-in-law noticed the disorder, and various health scares, such as losing a tooth from regurgitating stomach fluids that wore down her tooth enamel and passing out on Miranda Cosgrove's bathroom floor from dehydration.

In addition to her struggles with eating disorders, McCurdy is a recovering alcoholic, having begun drinking heavily shortly before her mother's death.

Filmography

Film

Television

Video games

Music videos

Web

Director

Discography

 Jennette McCurdy (2012)

Bibliography 
I'm Glad My Mom Died (2022)

Awards and nominations

References

External links

 
 
 
 
 
 Jennette McCurdy on YouTube

1992 births
Living people
20th-century American actresses
21st-century American actresses
21st-century American memoirists
21st-century American non-fiction writers
21st-century American singers
21st-century American women singers
21st-century American women writers
Actresses from Los Angeles
Actresses from Orange County, California
American child actresses
American child singers
American columnists
American country singer-songwriters
American film actresses
American people of Dutch descent
American people of English descent
American people of French descent
American people of Italian descent
American people of Swedish descent
American television actresses
American voice actresses
American web producers
American women columnists
American women country singers
American women memoirists
American women non-fiction writers
Capitol Records artists
Country musicians from California
Country pop musicians
EMI Records artists
Former Latter Day Saints
Journalists from California
Musicians from Long Beach, California
People from Garden Grove, California
People from Studio City, Los Angeles
People with obsessive–compulsive disorder
Screenwriters from California
Singer-songwriters from California